The first Cabinet of Khaled Chehab is the thirteenth government during the French mandate over Lebanon and the sixth during the era of the President of the Republic, Emile Eddé. The government was formed on March 21, 1938 and delivered the ministerial statement on March 25, then it won the acceptance of the House of Representatives with a majority of 41 votes against 14. 3 MPs did not participate, 4 were absent, and one abstained. The government lasted until October 27, 1938.

Source: Legallaw

References

1938 establishments in Lebanon
1938 disestablishments in Lebanon
Cabinets of Lebanon
Cabinets established in 1938
Cabinets disestablished in 1938